Cornelius Yate (some sources Yeate) (6 March 1651 – 12 April 1720) was an Anglican priest: the Archdeacon of Wilts from 9 April 1696 until his death.

Yate was born in Evesham and educated at St Mary Hall, Oxford. He graduated B.A. in 1671; and M.A. in 1674. He served curacies at Charney Bassett and Denchworth. In 1677 he became Vicar of Marlborough and in 1690 Prebendary of Bishopstone at Salisbury Cathedral.

References

1651 births
Alumni of St Mary Hall, Oxford
17th-century English Anglican priests
Anglican priests
Archdeacons of Wilts
1716 deaths